Central de emergencia is a Mexican telenovela produced by Televisa for Telesistema Mexicano in 1964.

Cast 
Ricardo Adalid
Luis Aragón
Antonio Bravo
Tony Carbajal
Jorge del Campo
Silvia Derbez
Gloria Estrada
Bárbara Gil
Héctor Gómez
Francisco Jambrina
Rafael LLamas
Bertha Moreno
María Eugenia Ríos
Teresa Selma
Dalia Íñiguez

References

External links 

Mexican telenovelas
1964 telenovelas
Televisa telenovelas
1964 Mexican television series debuts
1964 Mexican television series endings
Spanish-language telenovelas